Araratian Pontifical Diocese ( Araratyan Hayrapetakan t'em) is the largest diocese of the Armenian Apostolic Church and one of the oldest dioceses in the world, covering the city of Yerevan and the Ararat Province within Armenia.

History
The origin of Araratian Pontifical Diocese dates back the beginning of the 4th century. With the Christianzation of Armenia, Saint Gregory the Illuminator established the Catholicosate of All Armenians in Vagharshapat, as well as the Araratian Pontifical Diocese and appointed Bishop Albianus as the first primate vicar of the newly-founded diocese. The name of the diocese is derived from Mount Ararat; the symbol of the Armenian nation. At first, the diocese included the territories of the Ararat plain, Nakhijevan, Kotayk and the western territories of Lake Sevan. It is believed that the diocese was commonly known as the Diocese of Yerevan between the 15th and 19th centuries. Under the Russian rule during the mid-19th century, the jurisdiction of the diocese was expanded to include the territories of Syunik and Shirak as well, followed by the area of Kars in 1878, covering almost the entire area of Eastern Armenia. 

At the beginning of the 20th century, the Araratian Pontifical Diocese had 643 churches, 13 monastic complexes and more than 150 schools functioning under its jurisdiction. In August 1920, upon a kontakion issued by Catholicos George V, the territory of Shirak was separated from the Araratian Diocese to form the Diocese of Shirak. After the Treaty of Moscow in 1921, the Araratian Diocese lost the territories of Kars and Nakhijevan. The diocese lost most of its properties under the Soviet rule between 1920 and 1991.

With the independence of Armenia in 1991, the Armenian Church was reorganized, most of the properties were returned to the church and many new dioceses were established based on the administrative divisions of Armenia.

Currently, the Araratian Pontifical Diocese is the largest diocese of the Armenian Church, with around 1.3 million people under its jurisdiction. The primate vicar of the diocese is Archbishop Navasard Kchoyan, serving since 1999. The diocesan headquarters are located in the capital Yerevan, next to the Saint Sarkis Cathedral.

Active churches
As of June 2017, the diocese has the below listed churches and chapels functioning under its jurisdiction, operating throughout Yerevan and Ararat Province, with the exception of the 17th-century Khor Virap monastic complex in Ararat Province, the Cathedral of Saint Gregory in Yerevan opened in 2001, and the Surp Anna Church in Yerevan opened in 2015, which are directly regulated by the Mother See of Holy Etchmiadzin.

Here is the list of churches, monasteries and chapels functioning under the jurisdiction of the Araratian Pontifical Diocese, along with their location and year of consecration:

Churches
In Yerevan

Katoghike Church, 1264
Saint Hakob Church of Kanaker, 1679
Zoravor Surp Astvatsatsin Church, 1694 
Surp Gevork Church of Noragavit, 17th century
Saint John the Baptist Church, 1710
Saint Sarkis Cathedral, 1842
Surp Kiraki Church, 19th century
Holy Mother of God Church of Nork-Marash, 1995
Holy Vartanants Martyrs Church of Yerablur, 1998
Holy Mother of God Church of Malatia-Sebastia, 1998
Saint Sarkis Church of Nor Nork, 1999
Holy Mother of God Church of Avan, Yerevan, 2002
Holy Martyrs Church of Davtashen, 2003
Holy Trinity Church, 2005
Surp Khach Church of Charbakh, 2006
Holy Mother of God Church of Nor Nork, 2014
Holy Martyrs Church of Nubarashen, 2015

In Ararat Province

Surp Hakob Church, Ararat village, 1866
Saint Gregory Church, Byuravan, mid 19th century, rebuilt in 1999
Holy Mother of God Church, Dimitrov, 1868
Holy Mother of God Church, Verin Artashat, 19th century
Surp Hovhannes Church, Mkhchyan, 1890
Holy Mother of God Church, Dalar, 1890
Surp Sarkis Church, Argavand, 1897
Surp Hakob Church, Mrgavan, 1905
Saint George's Church, Kanachut, 1908
Holy Mother of God Church, Vedi, 2000
Surp Harutyun Church, Nerkin Dvin, 2000
Saint George's Church, Marmarashen, 2002
Holy Mother of God Church, Arevshat, 2006
Holy Mother of God Church, Shahumyan, 2009
Saint George's Church, Masis, 2009
Holy Mother of God Church, Norabats, 2014
Saint John the Evangelist's Church, Artashat 2015
Saint Thaddeus Church, Masis, 2015

Chapels
Saint Ananias' Chapel, Yerevan, 1889
Surp Khach Zoravor Chapel, Yerevan, 1991
Surp Karapet Chapel, Berkanush, rebuilt in 2006

Inactive/ruined churches and monasteries
This is an incomplete list of inactive or ruined churches and monasteries in the territory regulated by the Araratian Pontifical Diocese:
Holy Mother of God Chapel of Avan, Yerevan, 4th century
Katoghike Tsiranavor Church of Avan, Yerevan, 591
Surp Hovhannes Chapel of Avan, Yerevan, 12-13th centuries
Aghjots Vank near Goght and Garni, 13th century
Hovhannes Karapet Monastery near Lusashogh, 13th century
Holy Mother of God Church of Kanaker, Yerevan, 1695
Holy Mother of God Parochial Church of Avan, Yerevan, 19th century

References

Armenian Apostolic dioceses
Christianity in Armenia
Yerevan
Ararat Province
Oriental Orthodox dioceses in Armenia
Mount Ararat